Ashis Kumar Biswas is an Indian politician. He was elected to the West Bengal Legislative Assembly from Krishnaganj, West Bengal in the by-election in 2019 as a member of the Bharatiya Janata Party. The seat was vacant after the murder of the sitting All India Trinamool Congress MLA Satyajit Biswas.

References

Living people
West Bengal MLAs 2016–2021
Bharatiya Janata Party politicians from West Bengal
People from Nadia district
Year of birth missing (living people)
West Bengal MLAs 2021–2026